Connie Lou Weigleb Sipes is a former Democratic member of the Indiana Senate, representing the 46th District from 1997 to 2011.

References

External links
State Senator Connie Sipes official Indiana State Legislature site

 

Democratic Party Indiana state senators
1949 births
Living people
People from New Albany, Indiana
Women state legislators in Indiana
21st-century American women